Big Creek is a  long first-order tributary to Marshyhope Creek in Dorchester County, Maryland.

Course

Watershed
Big Creek drains  of area, receives about 43.9 in/year of precipitation, and is about 13.51% forested.

See also
List of Maryland rivers

References

Rivers of Maryland
Rivers of Dorchester County, Maryland
Tributaries of the Nanticoke River